Tapinarof, also known as benvitimod and sold under the brand name Vtama, is a medication used for the treatment of plaque psoriasis. The medication is applied to the skin. Besides its use in medicine, tapinarof is a naturally occurring compound found in bacterial symbionts of nematodes which has antibiotic properties.

The medication acts as an aryl hydrocarbon receptor agonist.

Tapinarof was approved for medical use in the United States in May 2022. The US Food and Drug Administration (FDA) considers it to be a first-in-class medication.

Medical uses
Tapinarof is indicated for the treatment of plaque psoriasis in adults.

Society and culture

Names
Tapinarof is the International Nonproprietary Name (INN).

Natural occurrence

Tapinarof, also known as benvitimod, is a bacterial stilbenoid produced in Photorhabdus bacterial symbionts of Heterorhabditis nematodes. It is a product of an alternative ketosynthase-directed stilbenoid biosynthesis pathway. It is derived from the condensation of two β-ketoacyl thioesters. It is produced by the Photorhabdus luminescens bacterial symbiont species of the entomopathogenic nematode, Heterorhabditis megidis. Experiments with infected larvae of Galleria mellonella, the wax moth, support the hypothesis that the compound has antibiotic properties that help minimize competition from other microorganisms and prevents the putrefaction of the nematode-infected insect cadaver.

See also 
 Pinosylvin, a molecule produced in pines that does not bear the isopropyl alkylation.

References

External links 
 

Psoriasis
Stilbenoids